Tahla is a monotypic moth genus in the family Gelechiidae. Its only species, Tahla zadiella, is found in Tunisia. Both the genus and the species were first described by Constantin Dumont in 1932.

References

Gelechiinae